Sydney Arthur Williams (17 April 1918 – 28 August 1976) was a Welsh dual-code international rugby union and professional rugby league footballer who played in the 1930s, 1940s and 1950s. He also appeared for Wigan (Heritage № 441) and Oldham RLFC (Heritage № 380) as a World War II guest player.

Background
Williams was born in Aberavon, Wales, and he died aged 58 in Neath, Wales.

International honours
Syd Williams won three caps for Wales (RU) while at Aberavon RFC in 1939 against England, Scotland, and Ireland, and won five caps for Wales (RL) while at Salford from 1940 to 1952.

References

External links
Statistics at wigan.rlfans.com

1918 births
1976 deaths
Aberavon RFC players
Barbarian F.C. players
Dual-code rugby internationals
Oldham R.L.F.C. players
Rugby league centres
Rugby league fullbacks
Rugby league players from Aberavon
Rugby league wingers
Rugby union players from Aberavon
Rugby union wings
Salford Red Devils players
Wales international rugby union players
Wales national rugby league team players
Welsh rugby league players
Welsh rugby union players
Wigan Warriors wartime guest players